Khaled Anam is a Pakistani actor, producer and singer. He has acted in various dramas, like Kahi Unkahi, Muqaddas, Bhaagti Bareera. As a singer, he's best known for his rendition of Shah Hussain's kalam Peera Ho during the 1990s. After a decade of working in advertising and communications, Anam pursued a career in the media industry, working in operations and content head with local media houses and successfully launched children’s television shows. He received the Pride of Performance Award in 2018 for his contributions in the media industry and for promoting education through children’s TV shows.

Early life and career
Born and raised in Karachi. He is the youngest of his siblings. His father, originally from Madras, was in the British Army. His mother, originally a teacher, who also sang for Radio Pakistan in the 1950s, was a Kashmiri who hailed from Sialkot. His family being inclined to arts, he himself learned to play the guitar and did theatre early on.

He has been associated with the TV industry since 1982.

Family
Anam's sons, Ammar and Komail, are both musicians. In addition to being a musician, his son Komail is also an actor, making his acting debut from Hum TV's Chamak Damak.

Selected filmography

Television

References

External links 
 

Pakistani male television actors
Pakistani male singers
Pakistani people of Kashmiri descent
Living people
Male actors from Karachi
Muhajir people
People from Karachi
Year of birth missing (living people)
Pakistani children's musicians